Constantin "Costi" Nica (born 18 March 1993) is a Romanian professional footballer who plays as a right-back.

Club career

Dinamo București
He made his debut for the first team on 5 May 2012, in a 1–0 Liga I loss against CFR Cluj.

Atalanta Bergamo and loans
On 11 July 2013, Atalanta acquired 85% of the player's rights from Dinamo Bucharest for a reported €1.6 million. He made his first-team debut on 18 August 2013, in a 3–0 Coppa Italia win against Bari. He made his Serie A debut as an 82-minute substitute for Cristiano Del Grosso.

On 11 July 2014, Cesena signed Nica on a full-season loan. He made his debut in a 3–0 Serie A loss against Juventus, making his way in as a 77-minute substitute for Luigi Giorgi.

On 25 July 2015, Avellino signed Nica on a full-season loan.

Nica joined Latina on loan for the 2016–17 season.

On 2 September 2017, he returned for the first time to Dinamo Bucuresti.

Several injuries and free agent 
The following three years, he suffered several injuries that kept him away from football and played only 2 official matches for FC Voluntari.

Second return to Dinamo București
On 1 September 2021 he signed a two-year contract with Romanian club Dinamo București after 5 months in which he trained with the team.

Pistoiese
On 28 January 2022, he returned to Italy and joined to Serie C club Pistoiese.

International career
Nica played for Romania U-19 team. In August 2012, he made his debut for the Romanian U-21 squad in a friendly game against Sweden. In August 2013 he made his debut for the senior team in a friendly match against Slovakia.

Honours

Club
Dinamo București
 Romanian Cup: 2011–12
 Romanian Super Cup: 2012

References

External links
 
 Profile at UEFA.com
 
 

1993 births
Living people
People from Ilfov County
Romanian footballers
Association football defenders
Liga I players
FC Dinamo București players
FC Dunărea Călărași players
FC Voluntari players
Serie A players
Serie B players
Serie C players
Atalanta B.C. players
A.C. Cesena players
U.S. Avellino 1912 players
Latina Calcio 1932 players
U.S. Pistoiese 1921 players
FK Vojvodina players
Romanian expatriate footballers
Romanian expatriate sportspeople in Italy
Romanian expatriate sportspeople in Serbia
Expatriate footballers in Italy
Expatriate footballers in Serbia
Romania youth international footballers
Romania under-21 international footballers
Romania international footballers